Neuroskeptic is a British neuroscientist and pseudonymous science blogger. They are known for their efforts uncovering fake and plagiarized articles published in predatory journals. They have also blogged about the limitations of MRI scans, which they began writing about after realizing that they and their colleagues did not entirely understand how some of their own MRI results had been produced. Their use of a pseudonym has been criticized as unethical, an accusation that they have denied. A 2013 Wired article by David Dobbs described Neuroskeptic as "one of the most insightful neuro-psycho-bloggers out there today".

Reception
The blog has been nominated for the following awards:
 2010 Research Blogging Awards - Finalist
 2012 UK Science Blog award from the Good Thinking Society - Shortlisted finalist

Publications

References

External links
Blog at Discover website
Interview with the BPS Research Digest

British bloggers
Living people
British neuroscientists
Anonymous bloggers
Year of birth missing (living people)
21st-century pseudonymous writers